Christopher Roland Somerville is a Canadian-American biologist known as a pioneer of Arabidopsis thaliana research. Somerville is currently Professor Emeritus at the University of California, Berkeley and a Program Officer at the Open Philanthropy Project.

Life and career 
Somerville majored in Mathematics and completed a PhD in Genetics at the University of Alberta, and then did postdoctoral research in the laboratory of William Ogren before serving as a faculty member at U. Alberta and Michigan State University. He directed the Department of Plant Science at the Carnegie Institution for Science at Stanford University and then the Energy Biosciences Institute at the University of California, Berkeley. He retired from the UC Berkeley faculty in 2017.

Somerville was co-founder and Executive Chairman of Mendel Biotechnology, Inc. and a co-founder of Poetic Genetics, LS9, Inc, and Redleaf Biologics.
Somerville has contributed to societal debates on the value of transgenic crops and biofuels.

Together with  Elliot Meyerowitz, Somerville was awarded the Balzan Prize in 2006 for his work developing the small mustard plant A. thaliana as a model. His interest in this plant was partly stimulated by a review article written by George Rédei.

Many trainees from Somerville's lab have started independent labs, including Mark Estelle, Peter McCourt, George W. Haughn, John W. Schiefelbein, Christoph Benning, Clint Chapple, Wolf-Dieter Reiter, John Browse, Sean Cutler, Dominique Bergmann, Seung Y. Rhee, Staffan Persson, Wolfgang Lukowitz, and C. Stewart Gillmor.

Research highlights 
 Pioneered ‘biochemical genetics’ approach to problems in plant metabolism, including photorespiration, lipid metabolism, and cellulose synthesis.
 First map-based cloning of an A. thaliana gene

 Lead development of The Arabidopsis Information Resource (TAIR) database and web resource

Selected publications

Review articles

Interviews and historical pieces

See also
 History of research on Arabidopsis thaliana

References

External links 
 Faculty page, with links to CV and list of awards
 Google scholar profile
 Royal Society page
 Open Philanthropy Project page

Living people
Members of the United States National Academy of Sciences
Foreign Members of the Royal Society
21st-century American biologists
Year of birth missing (living people)
Academic staff of the University of Alberta
Michigan State University faculty
University of Alberta alumni
Stanford University faculty
University of California, Berkeley faculty